Master of the Moor (1982) is a crime novel by Ruth Rendell.

Synopsis
Columnist Stephen Walby, known as the Voice of Vangmoor, often goes on long walks through the countryside that lies outside his window. However, events take on a sinister turn when he stumbles across the body of a young woman, whose face has been badly disfigured and her hair shaven. After another corpse surfaces he finds himself under suspicion from the local police, and when he then goes on to discover that his wife has been having an affair, tragedy ensues...

References

1982 British novels
Novels by Ruth Rendell
Hutchinson (publisher) books